Dhalbhumgarh railway station is a railway station on Howrah–Nagpur–Mumbai line under Kharagpur railway division of South Eastern Railway zone. It is situated at Dhalbhumgarh in East Singhbhum  district in the Indian state of Jharkhand.

References

Railway stations in East Singhbhum district
Kharagpur railway division